Procopius of Gaza ( 465–528 AD) was a Christian sophist and rhetorician, one of the most important representatives of the famous school of his native place. Here he spent nearly the whole of his life teaching and writing and took no part in the theological movements of his time.

The little that is known of him is to be found in his letters and the encomium by his pupil and successor Choricius. He was the author of numerous rhetorical and theological works. Of the former, his panegyric on the emperor Anastasius alone is extant; the description of the Hagia Sophia and the monody on its partial destruction by an earthquake are spurious.

His letters (162 in number), addressed to persons of rank, friends, and literary opponents, throw valuable light upon the condition of the sophistical rhetoric of the period and the character of the writer.

Procopius' theological writings consist of commentaries on the Octateuch, the books of Kings and Chronicles, Isaiah, the Proverbs, the Song of Songs and Ecclesiastes. They are amongst the earliest examples of the "catenic" (catena, chain) form of commentary, consisting of a series of extracts from the fathers, arranged, with independent additions, to elucidate the portions of Scripture concerned. Photius (cod. 206), while blaming the diffuseness of these commentaries, praises the writer's learning and style, which, however, he considers too ornate for the purpose.

Complete editions of the works of Procopius in Migne, Patrologia Graeca, lxxxvii; the letters also in Epistolographi graeci, ed. R. Hercher (1873); see also K. Seitz, Die Schule von Gaza (1892); L. Eisenhofer, Procopius von Gaza (1897); further bibliographical notices in K Krumbacher, Geschichte der byzantinischen Litteratur (1897), and article by G. Kruger in Herzog-Hauck's Realencyclopädie für protestantische Theologie (1905).

References

Bibliography

 Procopius Gazaeus. Opuscula rhetorica et oratoria. E. Amato (ed.). Berolini-Novi Eboraci 2009.
 Prokop von Gaza. Eclogarum in libros historicos Veteris Testamenti epitome. Teil 2: Der Exoduskommentar. Hrsg. von K. Metzler. Berlin-Boston: De Gruyter 2020.
 Prokop von Gaza. Der Exoduskommentar. Über-setztundmitAnmerkungenversehen (DiegriechischenchristlichenSchrift-steller der ersten Jahrhunderte. Neue Folge 28). Berlin–Boston: De Gruyter 2020.
 Rose di Gaza: gli scritti retorico-sofistici e le Epistole di Procopio di Gaza. Eugenio Amato (ed.), (Alessandria: Edizioni dell'Orso, 2010) (Hellenica, 35).
  Amato E. "Un discorso inedito di Procopio di Gaza: In Meletis et Antoninae nuptias", Revue des études tardo-antiques 1 (2011-2012), pp. 15–69.
  Corcella A. "Tre nuovi testi di Procopio di Gaza: una dialexis inedita e due monodie già attribuite a Coricio", Revue des études tardo-antiques 1 (2011-2012), pp. 1–14.

External links
Greek Opera Omnia by Migne Patrologia Graeca
Guide to Procopius of Gaza, Epitome Eclogarum in Heptateuchum et Canticum Canticorum. Manuscript, 1696-1697 at the University of Chicago Special Collections Research Center

5th-century Christians
6th-century Christians
6th-century Byzantine writers
Byzantine writers
465 births
528 deaths